Nagi may refer to:
Nagi, Bhojpur
Nagi, Panchthar